Alain Yomby (born September 23, 1982) is a Cameroonian footballer currently playing as a defender for Miramar Misiones in the Uruguayan Segunda División. 

Yomby was born in Bafoussam.

Teams
  Plaza Colonia 2004-2006
  Central Español 2006-2009
  Miramar Misiones 2009–present

References
 Profile at BDFA 

1982 births
Living people
Cameroonian footballers
Cameroonian expatriate footballers
Central Español players
Miramar Misiones players
Cameroonian expatriate sportspeople in Uruguay
Expatriate footballers in Uruguay
Association football defenders